Jawa Dam is a dam located in Rawalpindi District on Jawa River in Punjab, Pakistan.

The dam was completed in 1994 at a cost of PKR 20.13 million and has an estimated life span of 65 years.

See also
List of dams and reservoirs in Pakistan

Notes

Dams in Pakistan
Dams completed in 1994